DiY-Fest "the touring carnival of Do-it-Yourself mediamaking" was a festival of ultra-independent movies, books, zines, music, poetry, and performance art that ran from 1999 until 2002.  

In 2007, DiY-Fest was revived as DiY-Fest Video, a DVD production company devoted to alt-lifestyle instructional videos. Its first productions were Yoga For Indie Rockers (DVD release Oct 30, 2007), Pilates For Indie Rockers (DVD release Nov 13, 2007), and Vegan Cooking For Animal Lovers (DVD release Nov 13, 2007). Upcoming productions include Biofuel My Ride, Burlesque Workout For Indie Rockers, and an as-yet untitled DVD about solutions for ne'er-do-wells to "green your home without losing your black heart." DiY-Fest Video is distributed by HALO 8 Entertainment.

History
Founded by filmmaker Matt Pizzolo and organized by Kings Mob Productions, the festival initially launched as part of a “Do-it-Yourself Filmmaking Workshop” that Pizzolo and partner Katie Nisa ran after rough cut screenings of their cult movie “Threat.” The workshops were attended by a diverse, cross-subcultural audience largely from the independent film, digital hardcore, underground hip hop, hardcore punk, alternative media, and culture jamming scenes. Pizzolo observed that the DiY mediamakers shared a common ideology but developed their art in isolation from one another, so he expanded the workshop into the larger forum of DiY-Fest with the intention of engendering cross-subcultural DiY collaborations.  

In 2001, Digital Hardcore Recordings released the fest-soundtrack CD “DiY-Fest” compiling spoken word clips from people such as Howard Zinn and Jello Biafra with underground music ranging from agit-prop folk musician Ani Difranco to hip hop artists The Arsonists. Standout tracks on the album included the original collaborations “43% Burnt [remix]” (math-rockers Dillinger Escape Plan with noise-artists Atari Teenage Riot) and “Ghetto Birds [remix]” (hip hop songstress Mystic with breakbeat diva Nic Endo) . These collaborations were conceived by Pizzolo, who was so pleased by the results that he used them as the template for the mash-up album “Threat: Music That Inspired The Movie.”     

In late 2000, DiY-Fest was integrated into The Van’s Warped Tour with the hopes of exposing the underground mediamakers to a broader audience. The festival slowed down with intermittent bookings throughout 2002.    

A legacy of DiY-Fest is the growth of alt porn. The organizers of DiY-Fest observed porn as being independent media and were among the first to recognize and include gonzo, female-owned adult company Shane’s World as a DiY organization. DiY-Fest also hosted Suicide Girls at events when the site was still obscure, and, in a clever and controversial twist on the “Do it Yourself” theme, DiY-Fest partnered with female-owned sex shop Toys In Babeland to give away free vibrators at live events.

Soundtrack

DiY-Fest (Audio CD)
A compilation of spoken word and underground music released by Digital Hardcore Recordings in January 2006.

Track listing
 "Missing Press Conference" - George W. Bush
 "Alleged Accused Reputed Reused" - Matt Pizzolo vs Alec Empire feat. Seth Tobocman & Jello Biafra
 "Live At The Solidarity Conference" - Jello Biafra
 "The Life" - Mystic
 "43% Burnt [remix]" - Dillinger Escape Plan vs Atari Teenage Riot
 "Live At The Solidarity Conference" - Howard Zinn
 "Child Autonomous" - Creation Is Crucifixion
 "White Collar Crime Fight Song" - White Collar Crime
 "A Less Important Place (live acoustic)" - Miracle of 86
 "Digital Skinhead" - Space Robot Scientists
 "The Fight" - Hanin Elias
 "Iris" - Nicole Blackman
 "Fuel" - Ani Difranco
 "Ghetto Birds [remix]" - Mystic vs Nic Endo
 "Fellow Candymakers" - Sander Hicks vs The Heartworm
 "No More Prisons" - William Upski Wimsatt
 "The Show Must Go On" - 
 "One Fight" - Holocaust
 "Kill Cupid With A Nail File" - The Icarus Line
 "Live At The Solidarity Conference" - Safiya Asya Bukhari
 "Threat" - Kings Mob Productions
 "Bells I [Sci Fi Mix]" - Nic Endo
 "Orgasm" - Ducky Doolittle with Jello Biafra

DiY-Fest participants

Filmmakers
 Abel Ferrara
 Kings Mob Productions
 Matt Pizzolo
 Katie Nisa
 Lloyd Kaufman
 Jem Cohen
 Sarah Jacobson
 Harris Smith
 Esther Bell
 Shane's World
 Debbie Rochon
 Hook-Ups (“Destroying America”)
 Jim Jarmusch

Writers
 Howard Zinn
 Nicole Blackman
 Sander Hicks
 William Upski Wimsatt
 Cat Tyc
 Clamor Magazine

Activist Media
 CrimethInc.
 Zack Exley
 Safiya Asya Bukhari
 Independent Media Center
 PickAxe Productions
 Big Noise Films
 Fairness & Accuracy In Reporting
 Electronic Frontier Foundation
 Soft Skull Press

Performance Artists
 Jello Biafra
 Ducky Doolittle
 Radical Cheerleaders
 Kaiju Big Battel
 Aurora Cicero (tarot readings)

Illustrators/Photographers
 Seth Tobocman
 Jason Rose
 Buddyhead
 Suicide Girls

Musicians

 Kevin Devine
 Mystic
 Dillinger Escape Plan
 Atari Teenage Riot
 Creation Is Crucifixion
 White Collar Crime
 Miracle Of 86
 Space Robot Scientists
 Hanin Elias
 Ani Difranco
 D-Stroy
 Holocaust
 The Icarus Line
 Audiofile Collective
 Ian MacKaye
 Shipwreck
 Liars
 This Year's Model

References

External links
How To Make Things Magazine
DIY Invitations & Party Decorations

DIY culture
Concert tours
Rock festivals in the United States
Experimental film festivals
Film festivals in the United States